Sungai Jernih MRT station is an elevated rapid transit station on the MRT Kajang Line (KG line), located in the northern precincts of downtown Kajang, Selangor, Malaysia.  It was opened on 17 July 2017, along with 19 adjoining stations (from Muzium Negara to Kajang) as part of Phase 2 of the system.

The station stands at the northern gateway to Kajang town, along Jalan Cheras (which is part of Malaysia Federal Route 1 Federal Route 1) and just south of the southern end of the Grand Saga Expressway . There is a Lotus's Kajang branch, as well as the KPJ Kajang Specialist Hospital and the Hulu Langat district education department located in the vicinity.

During construction, the station was first provisionally named Saujana Impian, then Sungai Kantan, after the nearby housing project of Saujana Impian and Kampung Sungai Kantan village. This is one of two stations serving Kajang's town centre, the other being Stadium Kajang.

Station Background

Station Layout 
The station has a layout and design similar to that of most other elevated stations on the line (except the terminus and underground stations), with the platform level on the topmost floor, consisting of two sheltered side platforms along a double tracked line and a single concourse housing ticketing facilities between the ground level and the platform level. All levels are linked by lifts, stairways and escalators.

Exits and entrances
The station has two entrances, each on either side of Jalan Cheras. There is also a direct elevated walkway to the multi-storey park and ride facility located next to the station.

Bus Services

MRT Feeder Bus Services 
With the opening of the MRT Kajang Line, feeder bus service also began operating linking the station with the Saujana Impian area. The feeder bus operates from the station's feeder bus hub accessed via Entrance B of the station.

Other Bus Services 
The MRT Sungai Jernih station also provides accessibility for some other bus services.

Gallery

References

External links

 Sungai Jernih MRT station | mrt.com.my 
 Klang Valley Mass Rapid Transit website
 Probable route of Sungai Jernih MRT Feeder Bus. Route code: KJ 788, Bus code: T456

Rapid transit stations in Selangor
Sungai Buloh-Kajang Line
Railway stations opened in 2017